The Amos Hoffman House, on South Dakota Highway 10 in Leola, South Dakota, was built in 1905.  It was listed on the National Register of Historic Places in 1986.  It was delisted in 2021.

The house of Amos Hoffman, who was then living four miles southwest of Leola, was one of few Leola area homesteads surviving an 1889 prairie fire which destroyed Leola itself.

References

Houses on the National Register of Historic Places in South Dakota
Houses completed in 1905
McPherson County, South Dakota
1905 establishments in South Dakota